Chippewa Township may refer to the following places in the United States:

Chippewa Township, Mecosta County, Michigan
 Chippewa Township, Isabella County, Michigan
 Chippewa Township, Chippewa County, Michigan
 Chippewa Township, Wayne County, Ohio
 Chippewa Township, Pennsylvania

Township name disambiguation pages